Ładne  is a village in the administrative district of Gmina Włocławek, within Włocławek County, Kuyavian-Pomeranian Voivodeship, in north-central Poland. Judo player Sergio Ramos lives there.

References

Villages in Włocławek County